Charlotte Moton Hubbard (November 7, 1911 – December 18, 1994) was the U.S. deputy assistant secretary of state from 1964 to 1970, the first black woman to serve in this role.

Early life 
Charlotte Moton was born to Robert Russa Moton and Jennie Dee Booth Moton – both educators and community leaders – on November 27, 1911, in Hampton, Virginia. She had two sisters: Catherine and Jennie.

Charlotte Moton married Maceo W. Hubbard, an attorney with the United States Department of Justice and civil rights activist, on December 29, 1949. They were married until his death in 1991.

Education 
Hubbard graduated in 1931 with a certificate in Home Economics from the Tuskegee Institute, where her father was the principal, and later graduated from Boston University’s Sargent College of Physical Education in 1934 with a bachelor's of science degree in Education and Physical Education. While a student at Boston University, Hubbard refused to live in a segregated dormitory, raising the issue with university officials. Her early activism against racial discrimination continued throughout her life.

Career 
Hubbard began her career in 1934 as an associate professor of Health and Physical Education at the Hampton Institute in Hampton, Virginia. She served as co-director of the Hampton Institute Creative Dance Group and helped increase the number of female dancers in the dance company. She worked there until 1942 when she joined the Office of Community War Services, part of the Federal Security Agency, in Washington, D.C. Following the end of World War II, Moton worked and consulted in public relations with a variety of organizations, including the Girl Scouts of the USA, the Tuskegee Institute, and the United Givers Funds. She joined the State Department in 1963 as a coordinator of women's activities.

President Lyndon B. Johnson appointed Hubbard deputy assistant secretary of state for Public Affairs in 1964, the highest rank attained by a black woman at the time. In this role, Hubbard developed programs to address racial discrimination against Black soldiers during the Vietnam War. Hubbard retired in 1970 after the onset of Cushing's disease.

Death 
Hubbard died of congestive heart failure at the age of 82 on December 18, 1994, in Chevy Chase, Maryland.

References 

1911 births
1994 deaths
20th-century African-American people
20th-century African-American women
20th-century American people
African-American women in politics
Boston University alumni
People from Hampton, Virginia
Tuskegee Institute alumni